Made in Hong Kong (And in Various Other Places) is the title of a live / compilation CD/DVD by Finnish symphonic metal band Nightwish, released on 11 March 2009.

The album contains a CD and a DVD – the CD consists of eight songs recorded live during their Dark Passion Play tour in 2008, two tracks previously released as b-sides, and a previously unreleased demo version of "Cadence of Her Last Breath", predating Anette Olzon's joining the band and thus sung by bassist Marko Hietala (as were all the demos from Dark Passion Play). The DVD contains three music videos as well as a documentary featuring material from Israel to South America, directed by Ville Lipiäinen.

Background
When the information on the album was released, discussions outbroke in forums about the odd name compared to Nightwish's other album titles, which are generally more serious and deep. It was soon discovered, however, that keyboardist and band leader Tuomas Holopainen mentioned already in the Easter of 2004 that if they'd ever record a live EP in Hong Kong, it would be called "Made in Hong Kong".

The DVD contains Back in the Day... Is Now, a 40-minute-long mini-documentary chronicling the adventures of Nightwish during their Dark Passion Play tour from 2007 to 2008. The majority of the film is narrated by Holopainen, with chapters of the film divided by scenes of the band in their tour bus playing "Drunken Uno" - a game of Uno where the loser (who, more often than not, is bassist Marko Hietala) must consume a cup of Jägermeister.

Amongst the topics covered throughout the documentary is the incident during the band's show in Belo Horizonte, Brazil, on 10 November 2008. The film shows a YouTube video of lead vocalist Anette Olzon walking out during the band's performance of "The Poet and the Pendulum". Olzon explains that an improperly placed smoke machine interfered with her vocal cords.

Reception
The actual track list was rumoured long before its release in February 2009, and the general reception was that many fans were disappointed it didn't include remakes or live version of pre-Era songs, or any new songs except the previously unreleased version of "Cadence of Her Last Breath".

Such remakes/live versions would have been "Dark Chest Of Wonders," "Nemo," and "Sacrament Of Wilderness". However, the release of the album coincides with the band beginning to play older songs that Anette has not performed before on stage, such as 'Dead Boy's Poem', 'Romanticide', and 'Ghost Love Score', effectively ending the portion of the tour in which songs from Dark Passion Play dominate the set.

Track listing

MCD

DVD
 Bye Bye Beautiful (promotional video)
 Amaranth (promotional video)
 The Islander (promotional video)
 Back in the Day... Is Now

Credits
Anette Olzon - lead vocals
Tuomas Holopainen - Keyboards
Emppu Vuorinen - Lead guitar, Classic guitar
Jukka Nevalainen - Drums
Marko Hietala - Bass guitar, Classic guitar and male vocals
Troy Donockley - Uilleann pipes (on tracks 6 and 7)

Charts

References

External links
Nightwish's Official Website

2009 video albums
Nightwish albums
Nightwish video albums
2009 live albums
Music video compilation albums
Documentary films about heavy metal music and musicians
2009 compilation albums
Spinefarm Records live albums